The Vulgate is a late-4th-century Latin translation of the Bible, largely edited by Jerome, which functioned as the Catholic Church's de facto standard version during the Middle Ages. The original Vulgate produced by Jerome around 382 has been lost, but texts of the Vulgate have been preserved in numerous manuscripts, albeit with many textual variants. 

Vulgate manuscripts differ from Vetus Latina manuscripts, which are handwritten copies of the earliest Latin-language Bible translations known as the "Vetus Latina" or "Old Latin", originating from multiple translators before Jerome's late-4th-century Vulgate. Vetus Latina and Vulgate manuscripts continued to be copied alongside each other until the Late Middle Ages; many copies of (parts of) the Bible have been found using a mixture of Vetus Latina and Vulgate readings. Manuscripts of the Vulgate, together with the Codex Vaticanus, formed the basis of the printed Sixto-Clementine Vulgate in 1592, which became the Catholic Church's officially promulgated Latin version of the Bible.

History 
Though the Vulgate exists in many forms, a number of early manuscripts containing or reflecting the Vulgate survive today. Dating from the 8th century, the Codex Amiatinus is the earliest surviving manuscript of the complete Vulgate Bible. The Codex Fuldensis, dating from around 547, contains most of the New Testament in the Vulgate version, but the four gospels are harmonized into a continuous narrative derived from the Diatessaron.

Alcuin of York oversaw efforts to make an improved Vulgate, which most argue he presented to Charlemagne in 801. He concentrated mainly on correcting inconsistencies of grammar and orthography, many of which were in the original text. More scholarly attempts were made by Theodulphus, Bishop of Orléans (787?–821); Lanfranc, Archbishop of Canterbury (1070–1089); Stephen Harding, Abbot of Cîteaux (1109–1134); and Deacon Nicolaus Maniacoria (mid-12th century). The University of Paris, the Dominicans, and the Franciscans following Roger Bacon assembled lists of correctoria; approved readings where variants had been noted.

List of manuscripts

Old Testament 
List of some manuscripts from the Stuttgart Vulgate (officially known as Biblia Sacra iuxta vulgatam versionem) with siglum from the same source; no name means the Stuttgart Vulgate did not give it a name, no provenance means the Stuttgart Vulgate did not give it a provenance:

New Testament 

The list of manuscripts below is based on citations in Novum Testamentum Graece (NA27) and The Greek New Testament (UBS4). Each manuscript is identified first by its siglum (the first column, s., in the table), as given by the critical apparatus of the editions mentioned. These sigla are related to content, so are not unique. For example, the letter S refers to Codex Sangallensis 1395 in the gospels, but to Codex Sangallensis 70 in the Pauline epistles. So sigla need disambiguation. In the table below, this is done by providing a full name. Additionally, the standard unique serial number for each manuscript is provided.

Certain Latin NT manuscripts may present a mixture of Vulgate and various Vetus Latina texts. For example, Codex Sangermanensis (g / VL6) is Vetus Latina in sections of the Gospels and Acts, but Vulgate in the Pauline Epistles and Revelation.

Complete bibles

See also 
 Biblical manuscript
 Septuagint manuscripts
 List of the Dead Sea Scrolls
 List of Hebrew Bible manuscripts
 Vetus Latina manuscripts

References

External links 

 
Early versions of the Bible
Latin texts